Highdown New Mill or Ecclesden Mill is a tower mill at Angmering, Sussex, England which has been converted to residential accommodation.

History
Highdown New Mill was built in 1826. The mill was working until 1872. In 1880, the cap and sails were blown off. By the 1930s the mill was an ivy clad ruin. It was converted into a house in the early 1970s. The tower has recently been clad in wooden shingles.

Description

Highdown New Mill is a four-storey brick tower mill. It had four Patent sails and the beehive cap was winded by a fantail. The mill drove two pairs of millstones. All that remains today is the tower, with various additions and extensions.

Millers
Timothy pierce
 1829 - 1872

References for above:-

References

Further reading
 Online version

Tower mills in the United Kingdom
Grinding mills in the United Kingdom
Windmills completed in 1826
Windmills in West Sussex
1826 establishments in England